ISPA – University Institute (informally ISPA)  is a private research university located in Lisbon, Portugal.  Founded in 1962 as Institute of Psychopedagogical Sciences by catholic religious orders, it is mostly known for its teaching of psychology. The university also offers from bachelors to PhDs in biology. According to the Academic Ranking of World Universities, it is one of the 400 best universities in the world in psychology.

See also
 List of universities in Portugal
 Higher education in Portugal

References

Universities in Portugal
Research institutes in Portugal